Holy Saviour Church of Arrah also known as St. Mary's Church, formally known as the Church of George V, is an Anglican church in Arrah, Bihar. The church is regarded as one of the examples of Early English architecture. It was constructed in 1911, when George V was travelling from Kolkata to Delhi and stopped in Arrah for a day.

References

Churches in Bihar